Francisco Amancio dos Santos (21 February 1940 – 18 August 1968), commonly known as Chicão, was a Brazilian football player who played as a defender. He spent five years in the Spanish league.

Career
Chicão  signed for Valencia CF after impressing in a match against the Spanish club on 24 June 1961 as a part of the Orange Trophy, an annual friendly tournament. He stayed 4 years with The Bats, having a key role in their successful runs in  Inter-Cities Fairs Cup in 1962 and 1963. In 1965 he moved to crosstown rivals Levante where he played for one season. Chicão died in 1968, at the age of 28.

Honours
 Inter-Cities Fairs Cup: 1962, 1963

References

External links
 Profile on Zerozero
 
 

1940 births
1968 deaths
Footballers from Rio de Janeiro (city)
Brazilian footballers
Valencia CF players
Levante UD footballers
Botafogo Futebol Clube (SP) players
Association football defenders
La Liga players
Brazilian expatriate footballers
Brazilian expatriate sportspeople in Spain
Expatriate footballers in Spain